The 1897 Western Conference football season was the second season of college football played by the member schools of the Western Conference (later known as the Big Ten Conference) and was a part of the 1897 college football season.

Wisconsin, coached by Philip King, won its second consecutive conference championship with a record of 9–1 (3–0 against conference opponents). The Badgers' sole loss was against a team of Wisconsin alumni.  The Badgers shut out eight opponents and outscored all opponents, 210 to 14.  On defense, the team led the conference, allowing an average of 1.4 points per game. Pat O'Dea, an Australian who played fullback and excelled as a kicker, starred for the Badgers.

Chicago, coached by Amos Alonzo Stagg, finished in second place with an 11–1 record. On offense, Chicago led the conference with an average of 26.9 points per game. The most important game of the Western Conference season was played between Chicago and Wisconsin on November 13, 1897, at Marshall Field in Chicago. Wisconsin won the game, 23-8.

Three Western Conference players from the 1897 season were later inducted into the College Football Hall of Fame: O'Dea of Wisconsin; fullback Clarence Herschberger of Chicago; and end Neil Snow of Michigan.

Season overview

Results and team statistics

Key

PPG = Average of points scored per game
PAG = Average of points allowed per game

Regular season
Only 10 conference games were played during the 1897 season as follows:
 October 23, 1897: Chicago defeated Northwestern, 21-6, at Chicago	
 October 23, 1897: Illinois defeated Purdue, 34-4, at Champaign, Illinois	
 October 30, 1897: Chicago defeated Illinois, 18-12, at Champaign, Illinois	
 October 30, 1897: Wisconsin defeated Minnesota, 39-0, at Minneapolis.
 November 6, 1897: Michigan defeated Purdue, 34-4, at Ann Arbor, Michigan	
 November 13, 1897: Michigan defeated Minnesota, 14-0, at Detroit	
 November 13, 1897: Wisconsin defeated Chicago, 23-8, at the Chicago Coliseum
 November 25, 1897: Purdue defeated Minnesota, 6-0, at West Lafayette, Indiana
 November 25, 1897: Chicago defeated Michigan, 21-12, at Chicago
 November 25, 1897: Wisconsin defeated Northwestern, 22-0, at Evanston, Illinois.

Notable non-conference games during the 1897 season included the following:
 October 16, 1897: Michigan defeated Ohio State, 34–0, at Ann Arbor (the first Michigan–Ohio State football rivalry game)
 October 16, 1897: Northwestern lost to Iowa, 12–6, at Evanston, Illinois
 October 23, 1897: Minnesota lost to Iowa Agricultural, 12–10, at Ames, Iowa
 October 30, 1897, Purdue defeated Indiana, 20–6, at West Lafayette, Indiana
 November 6, 1897: Chicago defeated Notre Dame, 34–5, at Chicago
 November 13, 1897: Purdue defeated Missouri, 30–12, at West Lafayette
 November 20, 1897: Illinois lost to Carlisle, 23–6, at Chicago

Bowl games
No bowl games were played during the 1897 season.

Awards and honors

All-Western players
An All-Western team was selected by The Northwestern, consisting of the following players:

 Neil Snow, end, Michigan 
 James M. Sheldon, end, Chicago 
 Arthur Hale Curtis, tackle, Wisconsin 
 Jonathan E. Webb, tackle, Chicago 
 Richard France, guard, Michigan
 C. Rogers, guard, Wisconsin 
 Roy Chamberlain, center, Wisconsin 
 Walter S. Kennedy, quarterback, Chicago
 Ralph C. Hamill, halfback, Chicago
 John McLean, halfback, Michigan 
 Pat O'Dea, fullback, Wisconsin (NW)

All-Americans

No Western Conference players were selected for the 1897 College Football All-America Team.

References